Marc Wilson may refer to:

Marc Wilson (American football) (born 1957), American football quarterback  
Marc Wilson (footballer) (born 1987), Irish footballer
Marc Wilson (photographer), British photographer

See also
Mark Wilson (disambiguation)  
Marco Wilson (born 1999), American football cornerback
Marcus Wilson (disambiguation)